Hazza is an Australian journalist and musician. It may also refer to:

 Hazza (name), list of people with the name
 Hazza bin Zayed Stadium, multi-purpose stadium in Abu Dhabi, United Arab Emirates